A. Sitaram Naik is an Indian politician and academician. He was elected to the 16th Lok Sabha in 2014 General Elections. He represents Mahbubabad Lok Sabha constituency.

Career
He is an academician working at Kakatiya University, Warangal. He was an active Telangana activist. He won from Mahbubabad Lok Sabha constituency defeating Union minister P Balram Naik.

References

People from Telangana
People from Warangal
Telangana Rashtra Samithi politicians
India MPs 2014–2019
Lok Sabha members from Telangana
Telangana politicians
Living people
Year of birth missing (living people)